Cubuy River may refer to:

Cubuy River (Loiza, Puerto Rico)
Cubuy River (Naguabo, Puerto Rico)